Luca di Tommè (or Luca Thome) (c. 1330–1389) was an Italian painter active between 1356 and 1389 in Siena. He worked in the style established by earlier Sienese painters Duccio, Simone Martini, Pietro Lorenzetti and Ambrogio Lorenzetti. More than 50 works have been attributed to him.  This large output contributed to the long-term survival of the decorative Sienese style well into the 15th century.

He worked in 1389 with Bartolo di Fredi and Andrea di Bartolo on a large commission for an altarpiece for one of the cathedral chapels in Siena.  He created his images using tempera on wood panels, in a manner typical of the 14th century.

References

Further reading 
 
 A Reconstruction of an Altar-Piece by Luca di Tommè, by Sherwood A. Fehm, Jr, The Burlington Magazine (1973) page 463–466.
 Italian Paintings: Sienese and Central Italian Schools, a collection catalog containing information about Tommè and his works (see index; plate 23).

External links 
 

14th-century Italian painters
Italian male painters
Trecento painters
Painters from Siena
Year of birth uncertain
1389 deaths
Gothic painters